The 66th Pennsylvania House of Representatives District is located in west central Pennsylvania and has been represented by Brian Smith since 2021.

District profile 
The 66th District encompasses parts of Indiana County and all of Jefferson County, and includes the following areas:

Indiana County

 Banks Township
 Canoe Township
Cherry Tree
 East Mahoning Township
 Ernest
 Glen Campbell
 Grant Township
 Green Township
 Marion Center
 Montgomery Township
 North Mahoning Township
 Plumville
 Rayne Township
 Smicksburg
 South Mahoning Township
 West Mahoning Township

Jefferson County

Representative

Recent election results

References

External links 

 District map from the United States Census Bureau
 Pennsylvania House Legislative District Maps from the Pennsylvania Redistricting Commission.
 Population Data for District 66 from the Pennsylvania Redistricting Commission.

Government of Indiana County, Pennsylvania
Government of Jefferson County, Pennsylvania
66